The 1977 Swedish motorcycle Grand Prix was the tenth round of the 1977 Grand Prix motorcycle racing season. It took place on 23–24 July 1977 at the Scandinavian Raceway.

500cc classification

350 cc classification

250 cc classification

125 cc classification

50 cc classification

References

Swedish motorcycle Grand Prix
Swedish
Motorcycle Grand Prix